Maurer is a surname. 

Maurer may also refer to:

 Maurer, Perth Amboy, a neighbourhood in New Jersey, United States
 Maurer AG, a German steel construction company and roller coaster manufacturer
 Maurer Motorsport, Swiss auto racing team
 Maurer Motorsport (Germany), German race car builder